Shangrilá is a coastal resort or residential neighbourhood of the Ciudad de la Costa in the Canelones Department of Uruguay.

Geography

Location
It borders Parque Carrasco to the west, San José de Carrasco to the east, the Rio de la Plata to the south and Avenida Giannattasio to the north.

Etymology
Its name derives from James Hilton's imaginary land Shangri-La because it was so peaceful that it seemed that time did not pass.

 Shangrilá is acronim of:  Sociedad Hipotecaria Administradora de Negocios Generales Rentas Inversiones Locaciones Anónima (S.H.A.N.G.R.I.L.A), name of the society with argentinian capitals which was the propietary of the terrain.

History
Originally a seaside resort, now it is a residential neighbourhood and resort of Ciudad de la Costa. It was created in 1946 on 57 hectares, which were owned by the Sociedad Anónima Hipotecaria de Adquisiciones, Negocios, Inversiones y Locaciones. Between 1985 and 1996 its population increased 70%.

Population
In 2011 Shangrilá had a population of 3,195.

Source: Instituto Nacional de Estadística de Uruguay

Transport
As an extension of the Rambla of Montevideo, Route 10, known here as the "Rambla Costanera", crosses the stream Arroyo Carrasco and runs along the seafront of Ciudad de la Costa. The sister lake of the Lago Calcagno divides the resort from Carrasco Airport the other side of the lake and Route 101. Shangrila is divided by the long Avenida Luis Giannattasio, along which are concentrated the main commercial and service activities of the place. This avenue divides most of the resort from the lake to the north.

Places of worship
 Parish Church of the Most Holy Trinity (Roman Catholic)

Street map

References

External links
INE map of Colonia Nicolich, Paso Carrasco, Carrasco Int.Airport, and parts of the municipality of Ciudad de la Costa (incl. Shangrilá)

Ciudad de la Costa